New Westminster City was a provincial electoral district in the Canadian province of British Columbia from 1871 to 1912. For other electoral districts in New Westminster, please see New Westminster (electoral districts).

Demographics

Political geography

Notable elections

Notable MLAs

Electoral history 
Note:  Winners of each election are in bold.

|-

|Independent
|Henry Holbrook
|align="right"|Accl.
|align="right"|--%
|align="right"|
|align="right"|unknown

|}

|-

|Independent
|Alexander Rocke Robinson
|align="right"|Acclaimed
|align="right"|  -.- %
|align="right"|
|align="right"|unknown

|- bgcolor="white"
!align="right" colspan=7|1  The byelection was called due to Holbrook's resignation upon appointment to the Executive Council (cabinet) on November 14, 1871.  This byelection was one of a series held to confirm appointments to the Executive Council, which was the old parliamentary convention.  As this byelection writ was filled by acclamation, no polling day was required and the seat was filled within two weeks.  The stated date is the date the return of writs was received by the Chief Electoral Officer.
|}

|-

|Independent-Government
|Robert Dickinson
|align="right"|59
|align="right"|60.82%
|align="right"|
|align="right"|unknown
 
|Opposition
|Henry Holbrook
|align="right"|38 	
|align="right"|39.18%
|align="right"|
|align="right"|unknown

|}

|-

|Opposition
|William James Armstrong
|align="right"|64 	
|align="right"|43.84%
|align="right"|
|align="right"|unknown

|- bgcolor="white"
!align="right" colspan=3|Total valid votes
!align="right"|146
!align="right"|100.00%
!align="right"|
|- bgcolor="white"
!align="right" colspan=3|Total rejected ballots
!align="right"|
!align="right"|
!align="right"|
|- bgcolor="white"
!align="right" colspan=3|Turnout
!align="right"|%
!align="right"|
!align="right"|
|}

|-

|Independent
|William James Armstrong
|align="right"|Acclaimed
|align="right"|  -.- %
|align="right"|
|align="right"|unknown

|- bgcolor="white"
!align="right" colspan=7|2  The byelection was called due to the resignation of Ebenezer Brown on November 1881 because of ill health.
|}

|-

|Independent
|William James Armstrong
|align="right"|Accl.
|}

|-

|- bgcolor="white"
!align="right" colspan=7|2  The byelection was called due to W. J. Armstrong's resignation upon his appointment to the Executive Council (cabinet) August 23, 1882.
|}

|-

|Independent
|Henry Valentine Edmonds
|align="right"|34
|align="right"|20.24%
|align="right"|
|align="right"|unknown

|- bgcolor="white"
!align="right" colspan=7|2  The byelection was called due to W. J. Armstrong's resignation upon his appointment as Sheriff April 5, 1884.
|}

 
|Government
|William Douglas Ferris
|align="right"|37
|align="right"|14.86%
|align="right"|
|align="right"|unknown
|- bgcolor="white"
!align="right" colspan=3|Total valid votes
!align="right"|249
!align="right"|100.00%
!align="right"|
|- bgcolor="white"
!align="right" colspan=3|Total rejected ballots
!align="right"|
!align="right"|
!align="right"|
|- bgcolor="white"
!align="right" colspan=3|Turnout
!align="right"|%
!align="right"|
!align="right"|
|}

|Independent
|John Cunningham Brown
|align="right"|530
|align="right"|52.28%
|align="right"|
|align="right"|unknown

|Government
|Thomas Cunningham
|align="right"|321
|align="right"|37.72%
|align="right"|
|align="right"|unknown
|- bgcolor="white"
!align="right" colspan=3|Total valid votes
!align="right"|851
!align="right"|100.00%
!align="right"|
|- bgcolor="white"
!align="right" colspan=3|Total rejected ballots
!align="right"|
!align="right"|
!align="right"|
|- bgcolor="white"
!align="right" colspan=3|Turnout
!align="right"|%
!align="right"|
!align="right"|
|}

|Government
|David Samuel Curtis
|align="right"|574
|align="right"|49.14%
|align="right"|
|align="right"|unknown

|- bgcolor="white"
!align="right" colspan=3|Total valid votes
!align="right"|1,168 	
!align="right"|100.00%
!align="right"|
|- bgcolor="white"
!align="right" colspan=3|Total rejected ballots
!align="right"|
!align="right"|
!align="right"|
|- bgcolor="white"
!align="right" colspan=3|Turnout
!align="right"|%
!align="right"|
!align="right"|
|}

|Government
|Alexander Henderson
|align="right"|555
|align="right"|50.96%
|align="right"|
|align="right"|unknown
|- bgcolor="white"
!align="right" colspan=3|Total valid votes
!align="right"|1,089
!align="right"|100.00%
!align="right"|
|- bgcolor="white"
!align="right" colspan=3|Total rejected ballots
!align="right"|
!align="right"|
!align="right"|
|- bgcolor="white"
!align="right" colspan=3|Turnout
!align="right"|%
!align="right"|
!align="right"|
|}

|Government
|John Cunningham Brown
|align="right"|628
|align="right"|53.77%
|align="right"|
|align="right"|unknown

|- bgcolor="white"
!align="right" colspan=3|Total valid votes
!align="right"|1,168 
!align="right"|100.00%
!align="right"|
|- bgcolor="white"
!align="right" colspan=3|Total rejected ballots
!align="right"|
!align="right"|
!align="right"|
|- bgcolor="white"
!align="right" colspan=3|Turnout
!align="right"|%
!align="right"|
!align="right"|
|}

|Liberal
|William H. Keary
|align="right"|575
|align="right"|42.69%
|align="right"|
|align="right"|unknown
|- bgcolor="white"
!align="right" colspan=3|Total valid votes
!align="right"|1,347
!align="right"|100.00%
!align="right"|
|- bgcolor="white"
!align="right" colspan=3|Total rejected ballots
!align="right"|
!align="right"|
!align="right"|
|- bgcolor="white"
!align="right" colspan=3|Turnout
!align="right"|%
!align="right"|
!align="right"|
|- bgcolor="white"
!align="right" colspan=7|2 The Vancouver Province results were 854 and 657.
|}

|Liberal
|Frederick William Howay
|align="right"|547
|align="right"|39.96%
|align="right"|
|align="right"|unknown
 
|Canadian Labour Party
|James Samuel Rainey
|align="right"|147
|align="right"|10.74%
|align="right"|
|align="right"|unknown
|- bgcolor="white"
!align="right" colspan=3|Total valid votes
!align="right"|1,369
!align="right"|100.00%
!align="right"|
|- bgcolor="white"
!align="right" colspan=3|Total rejected ballots
!align="right"|
!align="right"|
!align="right"|
|- bgcolor="white"
!align="right" colspan=3|Turnout
!align="right"|%
!align="right"|
!align="right"|
|}

 
|Canadian Labour Party
|Walter Dodd
|align="right"|165
|align="right"|9.92%
|align="right"|
|align="right"|unknown

|Liberal
|John Joseph Johnson
|align="right"|6,17
|align="right"|37.10%
|align="right"|
|align="right"|unknown
|- bgcolor="white"
!align="right" colspan=3|Total valid votes
!align="right"|1,663 
!align="right"|100.00%
!align="right"|
|- bgcolor="white"
!align="right" colspan=3|Total rejected ballots
!align="right"|
!align="right"|
!align="right"|
|- bgcolor="white"
!align="right" colspan=3|Turnout
!align="right"|%
!align="right"|
!align="right"|
|}

|Liberal
|George Kennedy
|align="right"|385
|align="right"|27.72%
|align="right"|
|align="right"|unknown
|- bgcolor="white"
!align="right" colspan=3|Total valid votes
!align="right"|1,389 
!align="right"|100.00%
!align="right"|
|- bgcolor="white"
!align="right" colspan=3|Total rejected ballots
!align="right"|
!align="right"|
!align="right"|
|- bgcolor="white"
!align="right" colspan=3|Turnout
!align="right"|%
!align="right"|
!align="right"|
|}

See also 

New Westminster (electoral districts) - other New Westminster-area ridings

Former provincial electoral districts of British Columbia
New Westminster